Sarlat-la-Canéda, commonly known as Sarlat, is a commune in the southwestern French department of Dordogne, a part of Nouvelle-Aquitaine. Sarlat and La Canéda were distinct towns until merged into one commune in 1965.

Geography
The town of Sarlat is in a region known in France as Périgord Noir. It lies in the southeastern part of the Dordogne department, 7 km north of the river Dordogne.

Sarlat railway station offers train services to Bergerac, Bordeaux and Périgueux.

The commune is also served by Brive Vallée de la Dordogne airport (50 km), Bergerac Roumanière airport (70 km) and two bus lines.

History

Sarlat is a medieval town that developed around a large Benedictine abbey of Carolingian origin. The medieval Sarlat Cathedral is dedicated to Saint Sacerdos. This abbey appears in records as early as 1081 and was one of the few in the region that was not raided by the Vikings. The name for the abbey church was Saint Sacerdos by 1318; in the 20th century, it would become a cathedral under Pope John XXIII.

Because modern history has largely passed it by, Sarlat has remained preserved and one of the towns most representative of 14th-century France. Its historic centre, with 77 protected monuments, was added to France's Tentative List for future nomination as a UNESCO World Heritage Site in 2002. The excellent state of preservation owed a debt to writer, resistance fighter and politician André Malraux, who, as Minister of Culture (1960–1969), restored the town and many other sites of historic significance throughout France. The centre of the old town consists of impeccably restored stone buildings and is largely car-free.

Population

Economy

 Agriculture: Agriculture has long been of importance in the Dordogne area around Sarlat. Tobacco has been grown around Sarlat since 1857 and has historically been a major commodity for the area, although it is on the wane. Other agricultural commodities include corn, hay, walnuts, walnut oil, cheeses, wine, cèpes (a species of wild mushroom) and truffles.
Tourism: Numerous visitors—especially from northern Europe (the United Kingdom, the Netherlands, Belgium, Germany, etc.)—come on holiday to Sarlat and the region surrounding it and some have settled there permanently. The months of July and August are traditionally the haute saison (high season) for visitors, as is true in much of France outside Paris.
 Foie gras: There are several large foie gras factories including Rougié, and many small producers of foie gras in the area; other farms raise geese and ducks to produce products (confits, pâté, etc.) from these birds. The commune holds an annual three day festival, "Fest'oie", in honour of this significant part of its economy which also attracts numerous tourists.

A film festival has been held in the commune every November since 1991. Other events include the Truffle Festival, Christmas Market and Fest’oie in winter, the Ringueta of traditional games, and the Theatre Games Festival.

Notable inhabitants

 Étienne de La Boétie (1530–1563), judge, writer, and philosopher, friend of Montaigne
 François Fournier-Sarlovèze (1773-1827), French general of the Napoleonic Wars
 Gauthier de Costes, seigneur de la Calprenède (c.1610-1663), novelist and dramatist
 Gabriel Tarde, judge and sociologist (1843–1904)
 André Malraux (1901-1976), a square and a gallery of paintings bear the name of the former Minister of Culture. This is explained by the fact that he is considered by many Sarladais as the saviour of the historical district of the city. While visiting Sarlat, he realised that the city was in danger of ruins in certain neighbourhoods and that some monuments were being destroyed. The Saved Areas Act was drafted to save the city.
 Jean Nouvel (born 1945), architect, spent his childhood in Sarlat and transformed the ancient church of Sainte Marie into a covered market with monumental doors.
 Jean-Jacques de Peretti (born 1946), mayor of the city since 1989.

Cultural references
The town and region have featured in two major Hollywood films: Ridley Scott's The Duellists (1978), based on Joseph Conrad's Napoleonic tale; and more recently Timeline (2003), adapted from Michael Crichton's time-travel novel, and set in 14th-century France.

In the cemetery of Sarlat one can admire the pyramid tomb of François Fournier-Sarlovèze, who inspired the story behind The Duellists.

Other movies partly shot in Sarlat include: 
Ever After: a Cinderella Story (1998) by Andy Tennant
The Musketeer (2001) by Peter Hyams
Jacquou le Croquant (2007) by Laurent Boutonnat
The Messenger: The Story of Joan of Arc (1999) by Luc Besson

The city also appears in the first instalments of French author Robert Merle's saga Fortune de France, which tells the story of a fictitious Huguenot, Pierre de Siorac, during the 16th and 17th centuries in France.

See also
Communes of the Dordogne département

References

External links

 Official site

Communes of Dordogne
Subprefectures in France
Périgord